James Michael Hillman (born October 14, 1951), better known by the ring name "Mean" Mike Miller, is an American professional wrestler who had great success in Pacific Northwest Wrestling. Mean Mike was brought in to professional wrestling by Herb Welch. In Pacific Northwest Wrestling he wrestled for many years and held the NWA Pacific Northwest Heavyweight Championship and NWA Pacific Northwest Tag Team Championship a combined 11 times. During his career Mean Mike faced many wrestling legends such as Rip Oliver, Bobby Jaggers, Tom Prichard, Jerry Lawler, Chief Jay Strongbow, Brett Sawyer, Billy Jack Haynes, and Steve Doll.

Championships and accomplishments
Pacific Northwest Wrestling
NWA Pacific Northwest Heavyweight Championship (3 times)
NWA Pacific Northwest Tag Team Championship (8 times) - with Tom Jones (2), Karl Steiner (1), Moondog Moretti (1), Abbuda Dein (2), Rip Oliver (1) and Black Ninja (1)
Pro Wrestling This Week
Wrestler of the Week (May 24–30, 1987)
Ring Around The Northwest Newsletter
Tag Team of the Year (1985–1986)with Karl Steiner and Abudda Dein

See also
Pacific Northwest Wrestling alumni

References

External links
http://www.thewrestlingtalk.com/search/Mike%20Miller+Wrestling.html
Going Old School: Portland Wrestling – The Owen Family 60th Anniversary Extravaganza 5.21.85

1951 births
20th-century professional wrestlers
American male professional wrestlers
Living people
Professional wrestlers from Oregon
Sportspeople from Portland, Oregon